Dating Agency: Cyrano is a 2013 South Korean television series starring Lee Jong-hyuk, Choi Sooyoung, Lee Chun-hee, Hong Jong-hyun and Cho Yoon-woo. Based on the 2010 romantic comedy film Cyrano Agency, the series is about a dating agency that orchestrates romantic scenarios for paying clients, all in an effort to raise enough money to save an old theater.

The early working title was Flower Boy Dating Agency. It is the fourth installment of cable channel tvN's "Oh! Boy" series of Flower Boy programming targeted at the teenage demographic, following Cool Guys, Hot Ramen (2011), Flower Band (2012), and Flower Boys Next Door (2013).

Synopsis
This drama is about a dating agency that orchestrates romantic scenarios for paying clients, all in an effort to raise enough money to save an old theater. After Seo Byung-hoon (Lee Jong-hyuk) loses his best friend in an accident, the once-renowned theater director suffers from guilt and decides to save his late friend's theater troupe. Using his masterful stage skills, he forms the Cyrano Dating Agency.

Cast
 Lee Jong-hyuk as Seo Byung-hoon
 Lee Jae-joon as young Byung-hoon
After he loses his best friend in an accident, the once-renowned theater director suffers from guilt and decides to save his late friend's theatre troupe. Using his masterful stage skills, he forms the Cyrano Dating Agency.
 Choi Soo-young as Gong Min-young
A romantic, and one of the members of the dating agency. She believes the true feelings of her clients are more important than profit for the agency and is attracted to Byung-hoon.
 Lee Chun-hee as Cha "Master" Seung-pyo 
The chef of the restaurant that's next door to the theater where the dating agency is housed. He is the loan shark who originally lent the money to Do-il for the Cyrano theater, and is later revealed to be Do-il's younger brother. He is attracted to Min-young.
 Hong Jong-hyun as Moo-jin
Recruited into the dating agency because of his genius engineering skills, he is the brains behind all hi-tech gadgets used by the agency in the field.
 Cho Yoon-woo as Ah-rang
A 19-year-old high schooler who dreams of becoming a theater actor.
 Bae Seong-woo as Lee Min-shik
 Kim Min-kyo as Go Young-dal
Min-shik and Young-dal are Seung-pyo's loan shark goons, who intimidate Byung-hoon into paying his debt, and occasionally join in the agency's missions. Both of them eventually become Cyrano's prominent actors.
 Ha Yeon-joo as Hye-ri
A waitress at Cha Seung-pyo's restaurant. She is attracted to Moo-jin and later starts dating him.
 Kim Jung-hwa as Yoon Yi-seol
Byung-hoon's first love from high school, who ended up marrying Do-il. She was the one driving during Do-il's accident, which causes numbness to her right hand at times.
 Lee Min-woo as Go Do-il 
Do-il, Yi-seol and Byung-hoon were best friends in high school and founders of the Cyrano Theater Troupe. He later married Yi-seol, and died in a car accident.

Special appearances
 Ji Jin-hee as Seon Jung-nam, Min-young's F-ranked client at her old agency (ep. 1) 
 Lee Chung-ah as ballerina Seol Yoo-jin, the A-ranked client Jung-nam likes (ep. 1)
 Choi Won-young as the sommelier Yoo-jin likes (ep. 1)
 Im Hyung-joon as veterinarian Jin Joon-hyuk (ep. 1–3)
 Lee Yoon-ji as librarian Ma Jae-in (ep. 1–3)
 Lee Tae-min as idol singer Ray / Yang Ho-yeol (e.p 3–5)
 Jo Yun-seo as Min Se-kyung, the girl Ho-yeol has a crush on, but who likes Arang (ep. 3–5)
 Lee Kwang-soo as Choi Dal-in, a baker who's a masochist in love (ep. 6–8) 
 Goo Jae-yee as Dokgo Mi-jin, a chef and Dal-in's former rival in a cooking competition (ep. 6–8, 14) 
 Lee Yong-joo as Yeom Chi-moo, Mi-jin's chef ex-boyfriend who betrayed her (ep. 8)
 Jung Yu-mi as Bong Soo-ah, a creepy-looking "Ghost Girl" who hides behind her hair and can't look men in the eye (ep. 8–9) 
 Gong Yoo as the magician Soo-ah likes (ep. 9)
 Ye Ji-won as nurse Lee Hae-shim (ep. 10–12)
 Im Won-hee as firefighter Kim Chul-soo (ep. 10–12)
 Yoon So-jung as Madam Hwang, Moo-jin's grandmother and a dementia patient (ep. 10–12)

Original soundtrack
 Chance! - Peppertones 
 In the Same Storm - Big Baby Driver
 어떤 설레임 (A Certain Heart Fluttering) - Ra.D 
 그대라는 한 사람 (The One Like You) - Jessica Jung
 Take My Hands Tonight - Big Baby Driver
 Chance! (Bossanova Ver.) - Peppertones 
 Say Hello to the World - Big Baby Driver
 그대라는 한 사람 (The One Like You) (Inst.) - Various Artists
 어떤 설레임 (A Certain Heart Fluttering) (Inst.) - Various Artists
 Chance! (Guitar Ver.) - Peppertones 
 연애조작단; 시라노 (Dating Agency; Cyrano) - Various Artists
 수상한 연인 (Suspicious Lover) - Various Artists
 작전 시작 (Operation Starts) - Various Artists
 Miss Operation - Various Artists
 꿈속을 걷다 (Walk My Dreams) - Various Artists
 Dark Spy - Various Artists
 Missing You A Lot - Various Artists
 무언의 대화 (The Unspoken Dialogue) - Various Artists
 나른할 시간 (Relaxing Time) - Various Artists
 기다리는 마음 (Waiting for the Heart) - Various Artists
 I Am Here - Various Artists
 Supernova - Various Artists
 Psychedelic - Various Artists

Ratings
In this table,  represent the lowest ratings and  represent the highest ratings.

International broadcast

References

External links
  
 
 

2013 South Korean television series debuts
2013 South Korean television series endings
Korean-language television shows
TVN (South Korean TV channel) television dramas
Television series by CJ E&M
Television series by Oh! Boy Project
South Korean romantic comedy television series